Alfred Dryden Hales (22 November 1909 – 22 February 1998) was a Canadian businessman and politician. Hales was a Progressive Conservative party member of the House of Commons of Canada. He was born in Guelph, Ontario and had careers as a butcher, meat cutter, farmer, manufacturer and merchant.

Hales graduated with a Bachelor of Science in agriculture from the University of Toronto's Ontario Agricultural College in 1934. He also played two seasons as middle wing for the Toronto Argonauts in 1934 and 1935.

After an unsuccessful attempt to win the Wellington South riding in the 1953 federal election, Hales became a Guelph city councillor in 1955. He campaigned again for Parliament in the 1957 election. He was re-elected to consecutive terms at Wellington South, then from the 1968 election at Wellington. His Parliamentary career ended in May 1974 after he completed his term in the 29th Canadian Parliament, and Hales did not campaign in the 1974 election. He repeatedly introduced  a Private Member's Bill to create the Parliamentary Internship Programme until this was approved in 1969. Today, an annual award named in his honour is given by the Institute on Governance to the best essay by a Parliamentary intern.

Hales chaired the House of Commons Standing Committee on Public Accounts from 1966 to 1974, following the tradition that such a chair be a member of the Official Opposition.

Electoral record

Wellington South

Wellington

Archives 
There are Alfred Hales fonds at Library and Archives Canada and the Guelph Public Library.

References

External links
 
 

1909 births
1998 deaths
Members of the House of Commons of Canada from Ontario
Guelph city councillors
University of Toronto alumni
Progressive Conservative Party of Canada MPs
Sportspeople from Guelph
Toronto Argonauts players